Meshir 20 - Coptic Calendar - Meshir 22

The twenty-first day of the Coptic month of Meshir, the sixth month of the Coptic year. In common years, this day corresponds to February 15, of the Julian Calendar, and February 28, of the Gregorian Calendar. This day falls in the Coptic Season of Shemu, the season of the Harvest.

Commemorations

Feasts 

 Monthly commemoration of the Virgin Mary, the Theotokos

Martyrs 

 The martyrdom of Saint Onesimus, the disciple of Saint Paul the Apostle

Saints 

 The departure of Pope Gabriel I, the 57th Patriarch of the see of Saint Mark 
 The departure of Saint Zacharias, Bishop of Sakha

References 

Days of the Coptic calendar